Tinian Jr./Sr. High School (TJSHS) is a secondary school in San Jose Village on the island of Tinian in the Northern Mariana Islands.

In 1990 it became a high school. The name changed since the middle school grades (7 and 8) moved to the school in 1998.

Circa 2006 90% of the students were of Chamorro background, with the remainder being of Pacific Island and Korean backgrounds.

References

External links
 Tinian Jr./Sr. High School profile at the CNMI Public School System
 

Public high schools in the United States
Public middle schools in the United States
Schools in the Northern Mariana Islands
High schools in the Northern Mariana Islands
Educational institutions established in 1990
1990 establishments in the Northern Mariana Islands